Salto Mortale is a West German television series. It centres around a troupe of trapeze artists, known as the Flying Dorias as they embark on a major European tour.

Main cast
 Gustav Knuth as Carlo Doria 
 Gitty Djamal as Lola 
 Horst Janson as  Sascha Doria
 Andreas Blum as Rudolpho 
 Hans-Jürgen Bäumler as  Vicco 
 Karla Chadimová as Nina
 Margitta Scherr as Francis 
 Hans Söhnker as Direktor Kogler 
 Sabine Eggerth as Helga
 Wilhelm Bühring as Gordon
 Hellmut Lange as Mischa
 Andrea L'Arronge as  Biggi 
 Niko Macoulis as Pedro
 Alexander Vogelmann as Tino
 Yumata Pauli as Ansagerin
 Bum Krüger as Horn
 Helmut Werner as  Helmut
 Joseph Offenbach as Manager Jacobsen
 Ursula von Manescul as Brenda Lind 
 Bruno W. Pantel as Texas Bill
 Kai Fischer as Tiger-Lilli 
 Irmgard Paulis as Jenny
 Margot Hielscher as Gloria

See also
List of German television series

References

Bibliography
 Bock, Hans-Michael & Bergfelder, Tim. The Concise CineGraph. Encyclopedia of German Cinema. Berghahn Books, 2009.

External links
 

1960s German television series
1969 German television series debuts
1972 German television series endings
Circus television shows
German-language television shows
Das Erste original programming